This is a list of the main career statistics of Czech professional tennis player Markéta Vondroušová.

Performance timeline

Only main-draw results in WTA Tour, Grand Slam tournaments, Fed Cup/Billie Jean King Cup and Olympic Games are included in win–loss records.

Singles
Current after the 2023 BNP Paribas Open.

Doubles
Current after the 2023 Indian Wells Open.

Significant finals
Vondroušová has reached one Grand Slam final at the 2019 French Open in singles event, but lost to Ashleigh Barty, in straight sets.

Grand Slam tournaments

Singles: 1 (runner-up)

Olympic Games

Singles: 1 (silver medal)

WTA 1000 finals

Doubles: 1 (runner-up)

WTA Tour career finals
Vondroušová made her WTA Tour debut in 2015 at the Prague Open in doubles, and since then, she reached three singles finals, plus the French Open final in 2019. She won one of them, International-level Biel Bienne Open in April 2017.

Doubles: 2 (2 runner-ups)

WTA Challenger finals

Doubles: 1 (1 runner-up)

ITF Circuit finals
Vondroušová made her ITF Women's Circuit debut in November 2014 at the $10K Antalya in singles. Since then, she has won seven singles and four doubles titles. Her most significant titles are one $100K Trnava Open and a $80K Prague Open, both achieved in 2017 in singles.

Singles: 11 (8 titles, 3 runner–ups)

Doubles: 8 (6 titles, 2 runner–ups)

Junior Grand Slam finals
Vondroušová has won two junior Grand Slam doubles titles alongside Miriam Kolodziejová at the Australian Open and French Open in 2015. She also finished as runner-up at the French Open in 2014 alongside CiCi Bellis.

Girls' doubles: 3 (2 titles, 1 runner–up)

WTA Tour career earnings 
Current through the 2023 Linz Open.

Career Grand Slam statistics

Grand Slam tournament seedings 
The tournaments won by Vondroušová are in boldface, and advanced into finals by Vondroušová are in italics.

Best Grand Slam results details 
Grand Slam winners are in boldface, and runner–ups are in italics.

Record against other players

Record against top 10 players 

 She has a 8–15 record against players who were, at the time the match was played, ranked in the top 10.

Notes

References

External links
 
 

Tennis career statistics